Saba is a Caribbean island and the smallest special municipality (officially "public body") of the Netherlands. The island lies in the northern Leeward Islands portion of the West Indies, southeast of the Virgin Islands. Together with Bonaire and Sint Eustatius it forms the BES islands.

It is the smallest territory by permanent population in the Americas. Its towns and major settlements are The Bottom (the capital), Windwardside, Zion's Hill and St. Johns.

Etymology
Theories about the origin of Saba's name include siba (the Arawakan word for 'rock'), sabot, sábado, and Sheba. The island was referred to by its present name, Saba, as early as 1595 when it appeared in a voyage account by John Hawkins. Before its present name, the island was designated "St. Christopher" (San Cristóbal) by Christopher Columbus.

History

Saba is thought to have been inhabited by the Ciboney people as early as the 1100s BC. Later, circa 800 AD, Arawak people from South America settled on the island.

Christopher Columbus is said to have sighted the island on 13November 1493, however, he did not land, being deterred by the island's perilous rocky shores. In 1632, a group of shipwrecked Englishmen landed upon Saba. In the 1640s, the Dutch governor of the neighbouring island of Sint Eustatius sent several Dutch families over to colonise the island for the Dutch West India Company. In 1664, refusing to swear allegiance to the English crown, these original Dutch settlers were evicted to St.Maarten by Jamaican governors-cum-pirates Edward, Thomas, and Henry Morgan. The Netherlands eventually gained complete control of the island in 1816.

In the 17th and 18th centuries, Saba's major industries were sugar, indigo and rum produced on plantations owned by Dutchmen living on St. Eustatius, and later fishing, particularly lobster fishing. To work these plantations, slaves from Africa were imported. In the 17th century, Saba was believed to be a favourable hideout for Jamaican pirates. England also deported its "undesirable" people to live in the Caribbean colonies, and some of them also became pirates, a few taking haven on Saba. As the island's coast is forbidding and steep, the island became a private sanctuary for the families of smugglers and pirates. A notable Saban pirate was Hiram Beakes, son of the Dutch councillor of the island.

Later, legitimate sailing and trade became important, and many of the island's men took to the sea. During that time, Saba lace, a Spanish form of needlework introduced by a nun from Venezuela, became an important product made by the island's women.

In August 1857 Venezuela and The Netherlands submitted to Arbitration by the Queen of Spain a dispute over the possession of Isla de Aves, because the Netherlands considered that the island was linked to its colony of Saba by a Sand Bank, and fishermen from St. Eustatius and Saba had used the place to harvest turtles and birds' eggs, While Venezuela argued that it had inherited the island from Spain which had discovered all the Caribbean islands, that the fishermen were not acting on behalf of any government but for a particular interest and that this island was not attached to the territory that the Netherlands had received.

The Spanish sentence of June 30, 1865 declared that the ownership of the Island belonged to Venezuela and that the Netherlands should nevertheless be compensated. It argued that even if the two islands had been united, the sandbank was now separate from the island of Saba and that the first state to have a military force and to exercise sovereignty there had been Venezuela, which had inherited it from the Captaincy General of Venezuela.

Throughout the late 19thcentury and early 20thcentury, the primary source of revenue for the island came from the lacework produced by these women. During this period of time, with most of the island's men gone out to sea for extended periods, the island became known as "The Island of Women".

In 1943, Joseph 'Lambee' Hassell, a self-taught engineer, began building a road on Saba, drastically improving transport on the island, which prior to that had been carried out only by foot or by mule. An airport followed in 1963, and a larger pier geared for tourist boats in 1972. As a result, tourism increased, gradually becoming a major part of the Saban economy.

In 1978 Venezuela and the Kingdom of the Netherlands signed the maritime limits treaty that defined the extension of the Dutch and Venezuelan exclusive economic zone in 2 areas, the first one between the islands of Aruba, Curaçao and Bonaire (in front of the State of Falcon in Venezuela and next to the Los Monjes Archipelago) and a second area further north that includes the islands of Saba and St. Eustatius, the latter taking as a reference the Isla de Aves (the northernmost point of Venezuela in the Caribbean Sea). At that time, the six islands were part of an administrative entity called the Netherlands Antilles. The treaty recognizes an equidistant or median line between the Island of Aves and the Island of Saba as a maritime boundary.

A status referendum was held in Saba on 5November 2004. 86.05% of the population voted for closer links to the Netherlands. This was duly achieved in October 2010, when the Netherlands Antilles was dissolved and Saba became a special municipality of the Netherlands.

Geography and ecology

It lies north-west of Sint Eustatius and south-west of Saint Barthélemy and Sint Maarten. The terrain is generally mountainous, culminating in Mount Scenery in the island's centre. Off the north coast lies the much smaller Green Island.

Saba is the northernmost active volcano in the Lesser Antilles Volcanic Arc chain of islands. At , Mount Scenery is also the highest point within the Kingdom of the Netherlands. Between 1995 and 1997, an increase in local seismic activity was associated with a 7–12 °C (13–22 °F) rise in the temperature of the hot springs on the island's northwest and southeast coasts.

There is an  cloud forest located at and above  on top of the mountain referred to as the "Elfin Forest Reserve" because of its high altitude mist and mossy appearance. The most dominant tree in the cloud forest is the Mountain Mahogany (Freziera undulate), although hurricanes over the years have destroyed a large number of the mature trees. Despite the name, the mountain mahogany is not related to other mahogany species; although one species of true mahogany tree is found on the island at lower levels, the small-leaved mahogany (Swietenia mahagoni). In the underbrush of the mahogany trees, the Sierran palm (Prestoea montana) and tree ferns dominate, with a large variety of epiphytes and Orchids growing on the trunks and branches of all the trees. Wild raspberries and plantain trees can also be found growing on most of the mountain. All seven of the Lesser Antilles Endemic Bird Area restricted-range birds occur in the Elfin Forest Reserve.

Below the cloud forest is a sub-montane forest, and the variety and average number of species are considerably less. Redwood and Mountain fuchsia tree trees grow wild in this zone, as well as cactus species such as the prickly pear, and Seagrape trees. On the lowest southern and eastern slopes of Saba are grassy meadows and scattered shrubs.  is a  national park located on the north coast of Saba. Formerly owned by the Sulphur Mining Company, the park was established in January 1998 and the property was officially turned over to the Saba Conservation Foundation in 1999. It stretches from the coastline all the way up to the cloud forest, and encompasses all vegetation zones present on Saba.

The steep terrain and sheer bluffs dropping almost straight down to the ocean's edge prevents the formation of mangrove swamps or much vegetation. There are eight bays tucked into the cliffs around the island; Cove Bay, Spring Bay, Core Gut Bay, Fort Bay (location of the island's only port), Tent Bay, Ladder Bay, Wells Bay and Cave of Rum Bay. The shoreline of the island is of particular value to sea birds, and has been designated an Important Bird Area (IBA AN006 – "Saba Coastline") by BirdLife International. Saba is home to about sixty species of birds, many of which are sea birds that use the holes and crevices of the steep cliffs and two small islands for breeding and feed in the waters around the island. Saba's shoreline is home to the Caribbean's largest breeding colony of Red-billed tropicbird (Phaethon aethereus). The Audubon's Shearwater (Puffinus lherminieri) is another common bird, and is the national bird of Saba as well as being featured on their coat of arms.

Being an island, Saba is home to a number of species including the Saban black iguana (Iguana iguana melanoderma), Red-bellied racer (Alsophis rufiventris), Saban anole (Anolis sabanus), and Lesser Antillean funnel-eared bat (Natalus stramineus stramineus). However, several non-native species have settled on the island, including the Underwood's spectacled tegu (Gymnophthalmus underwoodi), brahminy blind snake (Indotyphlops braminus), and non-native iguanas. All of which are believed to have arrived on cargo shipments from St. Maarten.

Saba Bank is the top of a sea mount and it is a prime fishing ground, particularly for lobster.

Government

Relationship with mainland Netherlands
Saba became a special municipality within the country of the Netherlands after the dissolution of the Netherlands Antilles on 10 October 2010 and is not part of a Dutch province. The island's constitutional status, as well as those of Sint Eustatius and Bonaire, is set out in the Law on the Public Entities BES (Dutch: Wet op de Openbare Lichamen BES).

Sabans vote for members of the Dutch House of Representatives, the members of which are elected on a party-list proportional method. During the 2017 Dutch general election, a majority of Sabans voted for Democrats 66. Of the island's 2,000 residents, 900 were eligible to vote, and of those, 42.8% (or 385 people) voted.

Sabans with Dutch nationality are allowed to vote in elections for the Electoral College to elect the members of the Dutch Senate. The 2019 elections on Saba, held concurrently with the 2019 Island Council Elections resulted in four of the five Saban seats in the Electoral College going to the Windward Islands People's Movement and one seat going to the Saba Labour Party.

Governor
The island governor is the head of the government of Saba. The Dutch monarch appoints the governor for a term of six years, and he or she falls under the supervision of the minister of the interior and kingdom relations. The island governor chairs meetings of both the Island Council and the Executive Council.

They are also responsible for representing the island's government both in and out of court, maintaining public order, implementing policy and legislation, coordinating with other governments, and receiving and handling complaints about the island's government.

The incumbent island governor is Jonathan G. A. Johnson.

Legislature
Saba's legislative body is the Island Council, of which there are five members. Councillors are elected by the citizens of the island every four years. The Island Council holds the power to:
 Appoint and remove commissioners of the Executive Council.
 Pass ordinances to be enforced by the Executive Council.
 Ask questions of the Executive Council.
 Begin an investigation into the governor or the Executive Council.
 Approve the budget.

Following the 2019 island elections, the Windward Islands People's Movement (WIPM) holds all five seats on the Island Council. In 2019, Esmeralda Johnson was the youngest person ever to be elected to the council.

Members of the Island Council are:

Executive
The Executive Council, appointed by the Island Council, acts as the executive branch of government. The council has the following responsibilities:

 Day-to-day administration of the island, except for duties reserved for the Island Council or the governor.
 Executing policies and legislation passed by the Island Council.
 Establishing rules regarding the administration of the island, except the Registry.
 Appointing, promoting, suspending, or dismissing public officials, except those working for and including the registrar.
 Preparing defence of the island.
 Maintaining contact with Dutch ministries in the Hague.
 Executing policies and legislation from the national government.

The council appoints the island secretary, currently Tim Muller.

The council consists of the island governor and two commissioners appointed by the Island Council, currently both members of the WIPM. Each member of the Executive Council is assigned portfolios to oversee.

Society

The population of Saba (the Sabans) was 2,010 in 2017. Saba's small size has led to a fairly small number of island families, who can trace their last names back to around a half-dozen families. This means that many last names are shared across the island, the most numerous being Hassell, Johnson and Every; these three names are shared by upwards of 30% of Saba's population. 

Most families' ancestry is a result of the intermixing of Africans, Dutch, English, and Scottish. The population is also partly descended from the Irish who were exiled from that country after the accession of King Charles I of England in 1625. Charles exiled these Irish to the Caribbean in an effort to quell a rebellion after he had forcibly procured their lands for his Scottish noble supporters.

Historically, Saba was traded among the many European nations that fought for power in the region. Slaves from Africa were also imported to work on Saba. In recent years Saba has become home to a large group of expatriates, and around 250 immigrants who are either students or teachers at the Saba University School of Medicine.

Languages
Both English and Dutch are spoken on the island and taught in schools, and both languages are official. Despite the island's Dutch affiliation, English is the principal language spoken on the island and has been used in its school system since the 19th century. Dutch is only spoken by 32% of the population. English is the sole medium of instruction in Saba schools. Dutch government policy towards Saba and other SSS islands promotes English-medium education. English can therefore be used in communications of and to the government.

Saban English, a form of Virgin Islands Creole English, is the local vernacular. It is a decreolized variety.

There is one published dictionary of Saban English, Theodore R. Johnson's A Lee Chip: A Dictionary and Study of Saban English, which contains descriptions of grammar and pronunciation by Caroline Myrick, published in 2016.

Religion

Saba is predominantly a Christian territory. The main denominations are Catholics 45%, No denomination 18%, other denomination 11%, Anglicans 9%, Evangelical 4%, and Pentecostal 4%; at least 6% of the population is Muslim.

The first contact with Christians on the island occurred with the visit of Christopher Columbus in 1493, which did not mean the immediate arrival of the Catholic Church. It is believed that the first Christian groups to settle on the island were Protestants coming from the Netherlands in 1640.

During the period of nominal Spanish domination, the island was included in the jurisdiction of the Diocese of Puerto Rico

The oldest church on record is the Christuskerk (Christ Church), an Anglican temple that was renovated in 1777 after being damaged by a hurricane in 1772 and whose exact date of construction is unknown. In the same year 1777, Pastor Kirkpatrick also requested permission from the Dutch commander Johannes de Graaff to officially establish the Anglican Church in Saba before that some locals used the Reformed Church of the Netherlands to celebrate their baptisms.

Although the Roman Catholic Church is currently very active on Saba, it did not establish itself on the island until quite late. One of the earliest contacts includes the visit of Père Labat in 1701.

The island was also visited by the Prefect Apostolic of the Catholic Church for the Dutch Colonies in the Caribbean in 1836 Monsignor Martinus Niewindt, according to his report there was no Catholic priest to attend the island at that time. He returned in May of the same year with the Venezuelan priest Manuel Romero who had settled in Curaçao 1 year earlier for political reasons. Communication was difficult at first because neither of the two priests spoke English, Romero spoke only Spanish and Monsignor spoke only French and Dutch. In June 1836, the first Catholic mass on the island was officially celebrated in Saba. And 5 children were presented for baptism.

The oldest Catholic Church on record and still functioning today is St. Paul's Conversion Church in Windward, which dates back to 1860.

Missionary activity, the arrival of immigrants from other parts of the Netherlands and other territories in the Caribbean and Europe made the Catholic Church the most important to the present day,110 representing almost half of the believers.

Education and health
Saba is home to the Saba University School of Medicine, which was established by American expatriates in coordination with the government of the Netherlands. The school adds over 400 residents when classes are in session, and it is the prime educational attraction. A.M. Edwards Medical Center is the major provider of healthcare for local residents.

Same-sex marriage
In Saba (as in Bonaire and Sint Eustatius), marriage is open to same sex and opposite sex couples following the entering in force of a law enabling same-sex couples to marry on 10 October 2012. The first same-sex marriage was performed on Saba on 4 December 2012 between a Dutch man and a Venezuelan man, both residing in Aruba, where same-sex marriage is not performed.

Economy

Since 2011, the U.S. dollar has been the official currency, replacing the Netherlands Antillean guilder.

Agriculture
Agriculture on Saba is primarily livestock and vegetables, especially potatoes. Saba lace, also known as "Spanish work", is actually drawn thread work and is still produced on the island.

Tourism

The tourism industry now contributes more to the island's economy than any other sector. There are about 15,000 visitors each year. Saba has a number of inns, hotels, rental cottages and restaurants. Saba is known as the "Unspoiled Queen" of the Caribbean. Saba is especially known for its ecotourism, having exceptional scuba diving, climbing and hiking.

The Juancho E. Yrausquin Airport offers flights to and from the nearby islands of St. Maarten and Sint Eustatius. There is also a ferry service from St. Maarten; the ferry boats "Dawn II ~ The Saba Ferry" and "The Edge" both travel to Saba three times a week. In addition, there are anchorages for private boats.

About 150 species of fish have been found in Saba's waters. A main draw for divers are the pinnacle dive sites, where magma pushed through the sea floor to create underwater towers of volcanic rock that start at about  down and rise to about  beneath the surface. The waters around Saba were designated as the Saba National Marine Park in 1987, and are subject to government regulation to preserve the coral reefs and other marine life. Since 1991 the Saba Conservation Foundation has operated a hyperbaric chamber in case of diving emergencies.

Transport

There is one main road, known as "The Road". Its construction was masterminded by Josephus Lambert Hassell who, contrary to the opinion of Dutch and Swiss engineers, believed that a road could be built. He took a correspondence course in civil engineering and started building the road with a crew of locals in 1938. In 1943, the first section of the road from Fort Bay to The Bottom was completed. In 1947, the first motor vehicle arrived. In 1951, the road to Windwardside and St. Johns was opened. In 1958, the road was completed.

Driving "The Road" is considered to be a daunting task, and the curves in Windwardside are extremely difficult to negotiate. Driving is on the right hand side.

In 1963,  Saba residents built the Juancho E. Yrausquin Airport. This  landing strip is reputed to be the shortest commercial runway in the world, and is restricted.  Only trained pilots flying small STOL airliners, such as the Twin Otter and the Britten-Norman Islander may land there, as well as helicopters.

In 1972, a pier was completed in Fort Bay to access the island. Travel is also provided by ferry services to and from Sint Maarten with the Makana and The Edge ferries.

Of note are 800 steps carved from stone, known as "The Ladder", which reach from Ladder Bay to the settlement known as The Bottom. Until the late 20th century, everything that was brought to the island in boats and ships was carried up by hand using these steps. The steps are now often used by tourists who wish to experience an intense climb.

Energy
Like many Caribbean islands, Saba is dependent on fossil fuels imports, which leaves it vulnerable to global oil price fluctuations that directly impact the cost of electricity. Electricity supply depends on a diesel power plant to supply 60% of the island's demand.

According to a report by the Low Emission Development Strategies Global Partnership (LEDS GP), the Government of Saba made the decision to transform the island to 100% sustainable energy to eventually eliminate dependence on fossil fuel-generated electricity. This new energy policy is defined by the 'Social development plan 2014–2020' and 'Saba's energy sector strategy'. Intermediate targets are 20% renewable electricity by 2017, which was reached in 2018; and 40% by 2020, which is expected to be reached by March 2019.

Culture

The lifestyle on Saba is generally slow with little nightlife, even with the emergence of an ecotourism industry in the last few decades. Sabans are proud of their history of environmental conservation, calling Saba "The Unspoiled Queen".

Saban women continue to make two traditional island products, Saba Lace and Saba Spice. Saba Lace is hand-stitched lace, which the island's women began making in the late 19th century and built into a thriving mail-order business with the United States. Saba Spice is a rum drink, brewed with a combination of spices.

As in other Caribbean locations, Sabans throw an annual Carnival. Saba's Carnival takes place the last week in July and includes parades, steel bands, competitions, and food.

Another event held in the capital The Bottom is 'Saba Day'. This is the national day of the island in which all offices, schools and stores are closed. The island celebrates its diversity and culture through various activities and parades. The Bottom holds host to a concert at the sports field where local and other Caribbean artists come to perform. A wahoo fishing tournament is also held during Saba Day and attracts boats from neighboring islands such as St. Maarten, St. Eustatius, and St. Barths.

Media
There is one radio station on Saba, "Saba Radio" broadcasts on 93.9 FM and 1410 AM.

There is one online newspaper in Saba, Saba News, which publishes local news as well as pieces from the rest of the Dutch Caribbean.

Education
The primary school is Sacred Heart Primary School in St. John's. There is one secondary and vocational school in Saba the Saba Comprehensive School in St. John's.

Saba University School of Medicine is a for-profit medical school located in the Saba capital The Bottom.

Sports
The most popular sports on Saba are football, futsal, softball, basketball and volleyball.

Notable Sabans
 Cornelia Jones, innkeeper and politician
 Barbara Kassab-Every, Saba-born landscape painter
 Henry Earl Johnson, business owner and politician

See also

Caribbean Sea

Notes

References

Further reading
 . A first-person account by an American journalist of the eleven months he spent on Saba in 1931, illustrated with photographs of Saba at that time.
 . A dictionary, grammar and phonological description, with a history of Saban English in the introduction.
  Aguide to many of the plants of Saba, including their medicinal properties.
 
 Rahn, Jennifer. (2017). Saba and St. Eustatius (Statia). 10.1007/978-3-319-55787-8_6.

External links

 Island Government of Saba homepage
 Saba's Tourist Bureau homepage
 Saba Conservation Foundation's homepage
 Saba (N.A.): Bos en nationale parken. 54pp.

 
Islands of the Netherlands Antilles
Leeward Islands (Caribbean)
Caribbean special municipalities of the Netherlands
Dutch-speaking countries and territories
English-speaking countries and territories
Saba
Important Bird Areas of the Dutch Caribbean